Amico Ricci Petrocchini, Petruccini or Petruchini (1794-1862) was an Italian art historian and marquess. He is most notable for his 1834 Memorie storiche delle arti e degli artisti della Marca di Ancona, the first systematic survey of art history in the Marche. He also composed a number of cantatas for viola (1862).

Life
Born in Macerata to a noble family from that town, he was a knight of the Ordine Mauriziano and was made a member of Macerata's Accademia dei Catenati as recognition for his "dissertazioni". He died in Modena.

Works
 Elogio del pittore Gentile da Fabriano, Macerata, Giuseppe Mancini Cortesi, 1829.
 Le belle arti nella città di Gubbio, Bologna, Romano Turchi, 1831.
 Operette di belle arti, Bologna, Romano Turchi, 1831.
 Memorie storiche delle arti e degli artisti della Marca di Ancona, Macerata,  Alessandro Mancini, 1834, 2 volumes (Volume I). 
 Compendio delle memorie istoriche delle arti e degli artisti della marca d'Ancona, Bologna, Sassi alla Volpe, 1835.
 Dello stato geografico e politico del Piceno dopo la guerra marsica o sociale fino alla pontificia dominazione, Roma, Boulzaler, 1836.
 Dell'anello nuziale. Epistola del marchese Amico cavalier Ricci per le nozze della sorella Alba con il nobil uomo signor Giuseppe Lazzarini, Macerata, Cortesi, 1837.
 "Necrologia dell'abate Michele Colombo", in Giornale letterario-scientifico di Modena, giugno 1838.
 Monumento di Andrea Manfredi da Faenza, 13º generale dell'ordine de' Servi, Bologna, Jacopo Marsigli, 1840.
 Torri degli Asinelli e Garisendi, Torino, Fontana, 1840.
 Iscrizione sepolcrale di Guido Reni ed Elisabetta Sirani esistente in San Domenico di Bologna, Bologna, Marsigli, 1842.
 Degli uomini illustri di Macerata, Roma, Tipografia delle belle arti, 1847.
 Sulle arti degli antichissimi popoli. Lezioni, Perugia, Bartelli, 1847.
 Storia dell'architettura in Italia dal secolo IV al XVIII, Modena, Regio-ducal Camera, 1857-1859, 3 voll. Ristampa anastatica: Bologna, Forni, 1967.

The Memorie storiche

References

Bibliography (in Italian) 
 Anna Maria Ambrosini Massari (editor), Dotti amici. Amico Ricci e la nascita della storia dell'arte nelle Marche, Ancona, Il lavoro editoriale, 2007. .
 Anna Maria Ambrosini Massari, "Ricci, Maggiori, Gentile: la nascita della storia dell'arte nelle Marche e un disegno", in Cecilia Prete (a cura di), Gentile da Fabriano "Magister magistrorum" (atti delle Giornate di studio tenute a Fabriano il 28-30 giugno 2005), Sassoferrato, Istituto internazionale di studi piceni, 2006, pp. 129–146.

People from Macerata
1794 births
1862 deaths
Italian art historians